The 1989 Alaska Air Force season was the fourth season of the franchise in the Philippine Basketball Association (PBA).

Transactions

Occurrences
Going into their April 13 do-or-die encounter for the last semifinals berth against Añejo Rum 65, coach William "Bogs" Adornado was asked not to sit on the Alaska bench, the Airmen had an "open coaching among players" during that game with assistant Aric del Rosario and team owner Wilfred Uytengsu calling the shots. The next day in a meeting between Adornado, team manager Joel Aquino and owner Wilfred Uytengsu, Adornado was advised by the Alaska management to resign and gave up his position. In a letter of resignation, Adornado accepted responsibility for the team's dismal showing but blamed the management for their failure to get the services of a suitable import, Aquino handled the team starting the semifinals and for the rest of the first conference. 

Tim Cone, a member of the vintage panelists, guided the Airmen to a third-place finish in the Open Conference and soon accepted coaching chores for Alaska starting the Fiesta All-Filipino.

Notable dates
March 21: Alaska snapped a four-game losing skein with a 105–104 squeaker over Añejo Rum 65. Rookie Elmer Cabahug banged in a 15-foot jumper in the last five seconds to salvage the victory and dealt Añejo its fourth loss in five outings. 

March 28: Rookies Paul Alvarez and Ricric Marata didn't disappoint when the Milkmen preserve a 131–129 victory over Purefoods for their second win in a row. The Hotdogs came back from 20 points down in the last four minutes and Alaska coach Bogs Adornado failed to call a timeout on time when Purefoods gunner Al Solis sunk a three-pointer that closed the gap at 125–127 with 31 seconds left. Alaska import Carl Lott scored his highest output of 40 points in six games he played. 

April 4: Sean Chambers, who first came to the Philippines two years ago as part of the IBA selection and who replaces Carl Lott, scored five of Alaska's 10 points in the last 1:18 as they roll back Presto Ice Cream, 124-120, to register their third win against five losses. 

April 13: Alaska Milk overwhelmed Añejo Rum, 133-120, in the playoff for the fifth and last seat in the semifinal round. 

August 13: Alaska did a favor for San Miguel and Purefoods with its 105–97 win over Añejo that dashed the finals hopes of the 65ers. Milkmen Willie Pearson provided the big difference in the last 1:20 with his three-pointer and his daring drive off Dante Gonzalgo for a 102–97 advantage. 

October 3: Paul Alvarez scored 41 points and Elmer Cabahug added 30 points as Alaska bounced back from their opening night loss to Shell two days ago at the start of the Third Conference with a 141–128 victory over Presto Tivolis.

October 17: Alaska scored an easy 144–119 victory over Purefoods, giving the Hotdogs their first loss in five games.

Roster

Additions

Imports

References

Alaska Aces (PBA) seasons
Alaska